The Crooked Hinge is a mystery novel (1938) by detective novelist John Dickson Carr.  It combines a seemingly impossible throat-slashing with elements of witchcraft, an automaton modelled on Maelzel's Chess Player, and the story of the Tichborne Claimant. It was dedicated to fellow author Dorothy Sayers "in friendship and esteem".

In a poll of 17 detective story writers and reviewers, this novel was voted as the fourth best locked room mystery of all time. The Hollow Man also by John Dickson Carr was voted the best.

Plot introduction 
In his ninth outing, Dr. Fell spends July 1937 at a small village in Kent.  John Farnleigh is a wealthy young man married to his childhood love, and a survivor of the Titanic disaster.  When another man comes along claiming to be the real John Farnleigh, an inquest is scheduled to determine which individual is the real Farnleigh. Then the first Farnleigh is killed—his throat is slashed in full view of three people, all of whom claim that they saw no one there.  Later, a mysterious automaton reaches out to touch a housemaid, who nearly dies of fright, and a thumbograph (an early toy associated with the taking of fingerprints) disappears from a locked library.  Dr. Gideon Fell investigates and reveals the surprising solution to all these questions.

Literary significance and criticism
This novel was fourth in a list of the top ten "impossible crime" mysteries of all time (created by noted locked-room mystery writer Edward D. Hoch).

References

1938 American novels
Novels by John Dickson Carr
Locked-room mysteries
Novels set in Kent
Fiction set in 1937
Hamish Hamilton books
Harper & Brothers books